Xenocerus is a genus of beetles from the family Anthribidae, also known as fungus weevils.

List of species 
 Xenocerus acosmetus Wolfrum, 1953
 Xenocerus acrus Wolfrum, 1938
 Xenocerus albolineatus Blanchard, 1853
 Xenocerus albotriangularis Motschulsky, 1874
 Xenocerus alorensis Jordan, 1898
 Xenocerus aluensis Jordan, 1895
 Xenocerus anandrus Jordan, 1945
 Xenocerus ancyra Jordan, 1924
 Xenocerus andamanensis Jordan, 1894
 Xenocerus annulifer Jordan, 1903
 Xenocerus anthriboides Montrouzier, 1857
 Xenocerus atratus Jordan, 1903
 Xenocerus australicus Wolfrum, 1953
 Xenocerus barbicornis Gestro, 1857
 Xenocerus basilanus Jordan, 1903
 Xenocerus beesoni Jordan, 1937
 Xenocerus bicinctus Jordan, 1894
 Xenocerus birmanicus Jordan, 1903
 Xenocerus buruanus Jordan, 1898
 Xenocerus callimus Jordan, 1911
 Xenocerus charis Jordan, 1937
 Xenocerus cinctus Jordan, 1894
 Xenocerus compressicornis Jordan, 1894
 Xenocerus confertus Jordan, 1924
 Xenocerus conjunctus Jordan, 1895
 Xenocerus corae Gestro, 1875
 Xenocerus cratus Jordan, 1945
 Xenocerus cultus Jordan, 1945
 Xenocerus cylindricollis Fabricius, 1801
 Xenocerus dacrytus Jordan, 1924
 Xenocerus decemguttatus Jordan, 1895
 Xenocerus deletus Pascoe, 1860
 Xenocerus detersus Jordan, 1945
 Xenocerus discrepans Jordan, 1895
 Xenocerus dives Jordan, 1923
 Xenocerus divisus Jordan, 1945
 Xenocerus dohertyiJordan, 1894
 Xenocerus eichhorni Jordan, 1945
 Xenocerus eichorni Jordan, 1945
 Xenocerus enganensis Jordan, 1897
 Xenocerus epomis Jordan, 1913
 Xenocerus equestris Pascoe, 1860
 Xenocerus everetti Jordan, 1894
 Xenocerus evidens Heller, 1918
 Xenocerus fasciatus Jordan, 1898
 Xenocerus fastuosus Gestro, 1875
 Xenocerus fimbriatus Pascoe, 1860
 Xenocerus flagellatus Fåhraeus, 1839
 Xenocerus fruhstorferiJordan, 1894
 Xenocerus fucatus Jordan, 1945
 Xenocerus furcifer Jordan, 1898
 Xenocerus hamifer Heller, 1925
 Xenocerus henricus Jordan, 1903
 Xenocerus hippotes Jordan, 
 Xenocerus humeralis Gestro, 1875
 Xenocerus inarmatus Wolfrum, 1938
 Xenocerus insignis Pascoe, 1859
 Xenocerus interruptus Jordan, 1898
 Xenocerus jacobsoni Jordan, 1915
 Xenocerus kaioanus Jordan, 1945
 Xenocerus kuehniJordan, 1903
 Xenocerus lacrimosus Heller, 1923
 Xenocerus lacrymans J. Thomson, 1857
 Xenocerus lactifer Heller, 1918
 Xenocerus laevicollis Jordan, 1894
 Xenocerus lateralis Jordan, 1894
 Xenocerus latifasciatus Jordan, 1894
 Xenocerus lautus Jordan, 1904
 Xenocerus leucogrammus Motschulsky 1874
 Xenocerus licheneus Jordan, 1913
 Xenocerus lineatus Jordan, 1894
 Xenocerus longicornis Jordan, 1894
 Xenocerus longinus Jordan, 1898
 Xenocerus luctificus Fairmaire, 1883
 Xenocerus maculatus Jordan, 1898
 Xenocerus mamillatus Jordan, 1903
 Xenocerus megistus Jordan, 1945
 Xenocerus mesites Jordan, 1913
 Xenocerus mesosternalis Jordan, 1894
 Xenocerus metrius Jordan, 1945
 Xenocerus molitor Jordan, 1895
 Xenocerus monstrator Heller, 1918
 Xenocerus mortiensis Jordan, 1903
 Xenocerus nativitatis Gahan, 1900
 Xenocerus niveofasciatus Gestro, 1875
 Xenocerus ornatus Jordan, 1897
 Xenocerus perfossus Wolfrum, 1938
 Xenocerus perplexus Jordan, 1895
 Xenocerus phaleratus Jordan, 1945
 Xenocerus philippinensis Heller, 1923
 Xenocerus pictus Kirsch, 1875
 Xenocerus platyzona Jordan, 1913
 Xenocerus pruinosus Heller, 1918
 Xenocerus punctatus Jordan, 1894
 Xenocerus puncticollis Jordan, 1894
 Xenocerus purus Jordan, 1945
 Xenocerus rectilineatus Jordan, 1894
 Xenocerus rubianus Jordan, 1903
 Xenocerus rufus Jordan, 1903
 Xenocerus russatus Jordan, 1903
 Xenocerus salamandrinus Jordan, 1916
 Xenocerus saleyerensis Jordan, 1898
 Xenocerus samaranus Jordan, 1898
 Xenocerus sambawanus Jordan, 1895
 Xenocerus saperdoides Gyllenhal in Schoenherr, 1833
 Xenocerus scalaris Jordan, 1894
 Xenocerus scutellaris Jordan, 1897
 Xenocerus semiluctuosus Blanchard, 1853
 Xenocerus seminiveus Motschulsky, 1874
 Xenocerus senex Jordan, 1913
 Xenocerus sibuyanus Heller, 1923
 Xenocerus siccus Heller, 1925
 Xenocerus simplex Jordan, 1894
 Xenocerus speciosus Jordan, 1898
 Xenocerus speracerus Montrouzier, 1857
 Xenocerus spilotus Jordan, 1903
 Xenocerus striatus Jordan, 1894
 Xenocerus sudestensis Jordan, 1903
 Xenocerus suturalis Jordan, 1904
 Xenocerus tenuatus Jordan, 1945
 Xenocerus tephrus Wolfrum, 1953
 Xenocerus timius Jordan, 1945
 Xenocerus timorensis Jordan, 1928
 Xenocerus toliensis Jordan, 1898
 Xenocerus trapezifer Heller, 1925
 Xenocerus umbrinus Jordan, 1898
 Xenocerus variabilis Pascoe, 1860
 Xenocerus varians Jordan, 1898
 Xenocerus velutinus Gestro, 1875
 Xenocerus vidua Jordan, 1903
 Xenocerus vinosus Heller, 1923
 Xenocerus virgatus Jordan, 1913
 Xenocerus websteri Jordan, 1898
 Xenocerus whiteheadi Jordan, 1898

References 

 Biolib

Anthribidae
Weevil genera